Tetrapachylasma arcuatum is a species of symmetrical sessile barnacle in the family Pachylasmatidae.

References

External links

 

Sessilia